This list of legal awards is an index to articles related to notable awards for work related to the law, a system of rules that are created and enforced through social or governmental institutions to regulate conduct. The list is organized by country, since contributions are typically to the law of a country rather than to international law, and are made by citizens of that country,

List

See also

 Lists of awards
 List of awards for contributions to society
 Lists of humanities awards
 List of social sciences awards

References

 
Legal